The Journal of Nursing Management is a bi-monthly peer-reviewed journal covering advances in the discipline of nursing management and leadership. It was established in 1993 by Anthony Palmer, and is published by John Wiley & Sons. The journal is currently edited by Fiona Timmins (Trinity College Dublin).

Abstracting and indexing 
The journal is abstracted and indexed in the following bibliographic databases:

According to the Journal Citation Reports, the journal has a 2020 impact factor of 3.325,  ranking 143rd out of 226 in the category 'Management', 7th out of 124 in the category 'Nursing' and  7th out of 122 in the category 'Nursing (Social Science)'.

References

External links

Wiley (publisher) academic journals
General nursing journals
Publications established in 1993
English-language journals
Bimonthly journals